The Export and Imports Permits Act of Canada (R.S.C., 1985, c. E-19) governs the international transfer of "goods and technology" that have been determined by the government as "necessary to control". Sales with the United States are also specifically regulated by the 1959 Defence Production Sharing Arrangement.

In practice, these are:
 "arms, ammunition, implements or munitions of war, naval, army or air stores"
 "a natural resource that is produced in Canada"
 "any raw or processed material that is produced in Canada"
 any article, in order to ensure "adequate supply and distribution of the article in Canada"
 any article, "to ensure the orderly export marketing of any goods that are subject to a limitation imposed by any country"
 any article, "to facilitate the collection of information in respect of the exportation of goods"

History
"Canada suspended most exports of defence technology to Turkey in October of 2019 following the Turkish invasion of northwestern Syria."

On 6 October 2020, Francois-Philippe Champagne suspended the shipment of L3 Harris WESCAM products to Turkey because of reports that the Bayraktar TB2 drone incorporated them in their design.

In October 2020 during the 2020 Nagorno-Karabakh conflict, petrol-powered engine manufacturer the Austrian division of Bombardier Recreational Products voluntarily suspended shipment of those goods to Turkey when the former "became aware they were powering military UAVs", specifically the Bayraktar drone.

Project Ploughshares was on record as pushing for the inclusion of petrol-powered engines into the arms control regime because warfare has become mechanised.

References

Canadian federal legislation
1985 in Canadian law
International sanctions
Non-tariff barriers to trade
Free trade agreements of Canada
 
Business law
Country of origin
International law
Economy of North America
Trade blocs
International trade law